Count Stanisław Mieroszewski (Mieroszowski) (1827–1900) was a Polish-born politician, writer, historian and member of the Imperial Council of Austria.

Life 

He was the son of a landowner. From 1843 to 1844 he studied philosophy at the University of Fribourg in Switzerland and from 1844 to 1847 he studied philosophy and jurisprudence at the University of Freiburg in Germany. From 1847 to 1848 he lived in Paris. From 1849 to 1856, he managed the estates of his mother in Chrzanów. From 1863 he lived with his family in Kraków.

Political career 

From 1866 to 1872 Mieroszewski was a member of the local council in Kraków and the local agricultural society. From 1869 to 1874 he held the post of Chairman of the Kraków County Council. From 1879 to 1882 he served as a government councilor in Bosnia. From 1883 to 1885 he was a member of the Diet of Galicia and Lodomeria in Lviv.

In 1879 he was mentioned as Count Stanislaus Mieroszowski von Mieroszowice, a landowner, resident of Kraków.

Retirement and death 

In 1885 Mieroszewski retired from public life and after a brief stay in Bratislava in 1887 returned to Kraków. There he gathered important works of art and a rich library. He also published numerous feuilletons and articles (mainly letters and travelogues) in newspapers and journals.

Mieroszewski died  in Kraków.

References

1827 births
1900 deaths
Politicians from Kraków
Writers from Kraków
Polish Austro-Hungarians
Members of the Austrian House of Deputies (1873–1879)
Members of the Austrian House of Deputies (1879–1885)
Members of the Diet of Galicia and Lodomeria
19th-century Polish historians
19th-century Polish male writers
19th-century Polish politicians
Polish male non-fiction writers
University of Freiburg alumni
University of Fribourg alumni